This is a timeline of Bhutanese history, comprising important legal and territorial changes and political events in Bhutan and its predecessor states.

7th century

8th century

9th century

10th century

11th century

12th century

13th century

14th century

15th century

16th century

17th century

18th century

19th century

20th century

21st century

See also
History of Bhutan
List of rulers of Bhutan

References 

Bhutanese